Grant Colton Jaquith is an American lawyer who serves as a judge of the United States Court of Appeals for Veterans Claims. He served as the United States attorney for the Northern District of New York from 2018 to 2020.

Education 

Jaquith earned his Bachelor of Science, cum laude, from Presbyterian College and his Juris Doctor from the Fredric G. Levin College of Law.

Legal career 

Jaquith served as an Assistant United States Attorney for the Northern District of New York, including as First Assistant United States Attorney, Chief of the Criminal Division, Narcotics Chief, and Chief of the Albany Office. Jaquith attended The JAG School at the University of Virginia and entered U.S. Army JAG Corps. He served in the J.A.G. Corps from 1982 to 2011. He served as Staff Judge Advocate, Circuit Judge, and Chief of Military Law, rising to the rank of Colonel.

Before joining the U.S. Attorney's Office, Jaquith was in the litigation department of the law firm of Bond Schoeneck & King in Syracuse (1988–89) and a Judge Advocate on active duty in the U.S. Army (1982–88), where his work included administrative law, labor law, settlement of civil claims, legal assistance to soldiers, retirees, and their families, and criminal prosecutions. In 1984, he also taught Juvenile Law and Federal Income Taxation at Drury College. In 1982, he interned at the Public Defender's Office in Gainesville, Florida.

Federal judicial service 

On August 28, 2019, President Trump announced his intent to nominate Jaquith to serve as a judge of the United States Court of Appeals for Veterans Claims. On September 19, 2019, his nomination was sent to the Senate. President Trump nominated Jaquith to the seat vacated by Judge Robert N. Davis when his term expired on December 4, 2019. On November 6, 2019, a hearing on his nomination was held before the Committee on Veterans' Affairs. On January 29, 2020, his nomination was reported favorably out of committee. On July 23, 2020, the full United States Senate confirmed his nomination by voice vote. He received his judicial commission on September 1, 2020.

References

External links 

|-

Living people
Year of birth missing (living people)
Place of birth missing (living people)
20th-century American lawyers
20th-century American judges
21st-century American lawyers
21st-century American judges
Assistant United States Attorneys
Fredric G. Levin College of Law alumni
United States Army Judge Advocate General's Corps
The Judge Advocate General's Legal Center and School alumni
Judges of the United States Court of Appeals for Veterans Claims
New York (state) lawyers
Presbyterian College alumni
Recipients of the Legion of Merit
Trump administration personnel
United States Army officers
United States Army reservists
United States Article I federal judges appointed by Donald Trump
United States Attorneys for the Northern District of New York